The 1980 German Formula Three Championship was a multi-event motor racing championship for single-seat open wheel formula racing cars held across Europe. The championship featured drivers competing in two-litre Formula Three racing cars which conformed to the technical regulations, or formula, for the championship. It commenced on 30 March at Nürburgring and ended at Kassel-Calden on 5 October after seven rounds.

Bertram Schäfer Racing driver Frank Jelinski became a champion. He won round at Diepholz Airfield Circuit. His teammate and title rival Wolfgang Klein, who lost  just by one point won races at Nürburgring and Siegerland. Franz Kondrad completed the top-three in the drivers' standings. Harald Brutschin, Peter Kroeber, Michele Alboreto and Thierry Boutsen were the only other drivers who were able to win a race in the season.

Teams and drivers

Calendar

Results

Championship standings
Points are awarded as follows:

References

External links
 

German Formula Three Championship seasons
Formula Three season